Roshan Mistry  is an Indian athlete.  She won silver medals in  the  relay and individual 100 metres in the 1951 Asian Games.

References

Athletes (track and field) at the 1951 Asian Games
Indian female sprinters
Asian Games silver medalists for India
Asian Games medalists in athletics (track and field)
Medalists at the 1951 Asian Games